Chipewyan 201B is an Indian reserve of the Athabasca Chipewyan First Nation in Alberta, located within the Regional Municipality of Wood Buffalo. It is 16 miles southeast of Fort Chipewyan.

References

Indian reserves in Alberta